The Northern Standard, also known by the uniform title Northern standard (Darwin, N.T.), was a newspaper published in Darwin, Northern Territory, Australia, from 1920 or 1921 to 1955. The paper was published by the North Australian Workers' Union from 1928 to 1955.

The Northern Territory of Australia Government Gazette (1873-present) was published in at least four different Northern Territory newspapers, which are still available online through Trove.  They were:

 Northern Territory Times and Gazette (1873-1883; 1890-1927)
 The North Australian (1883-1889)
 The North Australian and Northern Territory Government Gazette (1889–1890)
 The Northern Standard (1929-1942)
 (Commonwealth Gazette (1942-1946) - included with the Federal Government's)

References

Bibliography

External links 
 

Defunct newspapers published in the Northern Territory
Publications disestablished in 1955